Riccardo Petroni (Born Siena ca 1250 : died Genoa 10 February 1314) was a senior cardinal in the Roman Catholic Church during the closing decades of the thirteenth century and the early years of the fourteenth century.

Biography  
Petroni studied at Bologna.   Later he taught at Naples.   Between 1296 and 1300 he was Vice-Chancellor of the Holy Roman Church.

A distinguished jurist, he collaborated on the Sextus Liber Decretalium, which was promulgated in 1299 by Pope Boniface VIII.   The “Sextus Liber” was intended as a follow-up to the better remembered Decretals (in five books) of Gregory IX.

Pope Boniface VIII created Petroni a cardinal at the consistory of 1298 when the latter became Cardinal-Deacon of the church of Sant'Eustachio in Rome.

He participated in the conclave of 1304-1305 which would result in the election of Pope Clement V, but Petroni himself was forced by illness to leave the conclave before it concluded.   He nevertheless attended the Council of Vienne in 1311 and towards the end of his life was the papal legate to Genoa.

Riccardo Petroni was responsible for various buildings and monuments in his home city of Siena along with a Carthusian monastery.

See also 
 Cardinals created by Boniface VIII

References 

1314 deaths
People from Siena
14th-century Italian cardinals
14th-century Italian jurists
University of Bologna alumni
13th-century births